David Carl Schilling (December 15, 1918 – August 14, 1956) was a U.S. Air Force officer, fighter ace credited with 22½ confirmed claims, and leading advocate of long-range jet fighter operations. Kansas' Schilling Air Force Base was named in his memory.

Early life
David Schilling was born in Leavenworth, Kansas, on December 15, 1918.  His family moved to Kansas City, Missouri, where he went to high school.  He graduated from Dartmouth College with a Bachelor of Science degree in Geology in June 1939.

Schilling joined the United States Army in September 1939 as an aviation cadet and received his commission in the Air Corps upon completion of flight training in May 1940. The following summer he became one of the original members of the 56th Fighter Group.

World War II
Schilling arrived with the group in England in January 1943 as commander of the 62nd Fighter Squadron and began combat missions in April flying the P-47 Thunderbolt, recording his first kill on October 2, 1943. Schilling was promoted to group executive officer in August 1943 and to group commander on August 12, 1944, commanding the 56th Fighter Group until January 27, 1945. He was promoted to full colonel on October 1, 1944, at the age of 25. "Hairless Joe", coded LM-S was his personal P-47 from July 1944 up until his last documented combat mission on Jan 5th 1945.

In his time in Britain, he became the sixth-leading ace of the 8th Air Force, scoring 22½ kills against Luftwaffe aircraft. On December 23, 1944, he downed five German fighters to become one of the 38 Army Air Force "Ace-in-a-Day" pilots. Schilling flew 132 combat missions in two combat tours with the 56th. He also destroyed 10.5 enemy aircraft on ground, while strafing enemy airfields.

USAF career
After the war, he again commanded the 56th Fighter Group and pioneered long-distance jet operations in the P-80 Shooting Star. In early 1948 Schilling conceived an operation called Fox Able (phonetic for "Fighter Atlantic") in which jet aircraft, then ferried to Europe by ship, could be flown across the Atlantic via Iceland and Scotland in 900-mile legs and sold it to Air Force Chief of Staff, General Carl A. Spaatz.

In the summer of 1948 he made Fox Able a reality and took the 56th FG to Germany in a show-of-force response to the Berlin blockade. Just prior to this, de Havilland Vampires of No. LIV Squadron RAF had made the first jet crossing, flying from the UK to North America.

In 1950, he flew from RAF Manston in the United Kingdom to Maine in the United States, in the first nonstop trans-Atlantic flight by a jet fighter. Using probe-and-drogue flight refuelling, Schilling, flying an F-84E Thunderjet and another F-84E flown by Col. William Ritchie, were refuelled by first a Flight Refuelling Ltd (FRL) Lancaster tanker near Prestwick, Scotland, followed by a refuelling from another FRL tanker, this time a Lincoln near Iceland. 

In a third and final tanker rendezvous, Ritchie's nose probe, which had been damaged in the refuelling with the Lincoln, was unable to transfer fuel from the final tanker, a USAF KB-29 offshore from Labrador, forcing him to eject over Labrador when he ran out of fuel. Ritchie was safely picked up shortly afterwards. Schilling's refuelling went as-intended and he landed at an airbase at Limestone, Maine, after a flight of ten hours and eight minutes.
 For this flight, Schilling received the Harmon Trophy.

In 1952, he took command of the 31st Fighter Escort Wing at Turner Air Force Base, Georgia, flying F-84 Thunderjets, and led a non-stop flight across the Pacific Ocean to Japan in Fox Peter One.

Death
On August 14, 1956, while serving as Inspector General in the Strategic Air Command's Seventh Air Division, Schilling died in a car accident on a narrow, two-lane country road in England between RAF Lakenheath and RAF Mildenhall — Royal Air Force stations used by the U.S. Air Force.

Colonel Schilling was driving a Cadillac/Allard sports-racing car; he, General Curtis LeMay, and other race enthusiasts had each purchased a model to form a stable for Sports Car Club of America events. On the day of the accident, he was driving to Mildenhall to meet at the Officer's Club with an Army lieutenant who had expressed interest in buying the car. At fairly high speed, he approached another car from behind, intending to pass. The cap he was wearing started to blow off and as he reached up to grab it, the car skidded sideways and struck the stone side-railing of a bridge at Eriswell in Suffolk, cutting the car in half at the driver's seat and causing the front of the car to topple into the stream below.

Schilling died instantly. The day before his death, he had flown his last flight in a B-47. At the time of his death he was on Temporary Duty (TDY) from the HQ of 7th Air Division at South Ruislip to RAF Lakenheath.

He was buried with full military honors at Arlington National Cemetery.

On March 15, 1957, Smoky Hill Air Force Base in Salina, Kansas was renamed Schilling Air Force Base in his honor. The Air Force Association's Award for Outstanding Flight, which Schilling won in 1952, was named for him after his death.

Awards and decorations

  Command pilot

  Distinguished Flying Cross (United Kingdom)

  Croix de Guerre with Palm (France)

  Croix de Guerre, with Palm (Belgium)

Notes

References
John C. and Charlotte McClure (1995).  "Follow Me": The Life and Times of David C. Schilling.  Taylor Publishing, Dallas.
Frank Olynyk (1995).  Stars & Bars: A Tribute to the American Fighter Ace 1920–1973.  Grub Street, London.

External links
Arlington National Cemetery
 "U.S. Jets Across" a 1948 Flight article
 "Drop Me a Line" a 1950 Flight photo of an F-84 being refulled by a Lincoln

1918 births
1956 deaths
American World War II flying aces
Aviators from Kansas
Harmon Trophy winners
People from Leavenworth, Kansas
Recipients of the Distinguished Service Cross (United States)
Recipients of the Distinguished Flying Cross (United States)
Recipients of the Distinguished Service Medal (US Army)
Recipients of the Silver Star
Recipients of the Air Medal
Recipients of the Distinguished Flying Cross (United Kingdom)
Recipients of the Croix de Guerre (France)
Recipients of the Croix de guerre (Belgium)
Road incident deaths in England
United States Air Force officers
United States Army Air Forces officers
United States Army Air Forces pilots of World War II
Burials at Arlington National Cemetery